Glen Klippenstein (born May 29, 1937) was a Republican member of the Missouri House of Representatives. Klippenstein represented the 5th District, encompassing all or parts of Buchanan, Clinton, De Kalb and Gentry counties in northwest Missouri. He is also a former interim State Senator for the 12th District.

Personal history
Glen O. Klippenstein was born May 29, 1937 on his grandparents' farm in Saskatchewan, Canada. He attended Academy of the New Church Secondary Schools in Bryn Athyn, Pennsylvania, graduating in 1955. Representative Klippenstein received his higher education at Penn State University, earning a degree in Animal Science in 1959. He moved to Missouri in the 1960s and established GlenKirk Farms, a cattle breeding operation which has sold cattle, semen, and embryos across America and worldwide. Klippenstein has served as chairman of the National Beef Promotion and Research Board, the American Polled Hereford Association, and by Presidential appointment, served on the Federal Ag Mortgage Corporation board of directors. In November, 2000 Klippenstein was named Chief Executive Officer of the American Chianina Association.
He and his wife Linda are the parents of four grown children and nine grandchildren.

Political history
Glen Klippenstein served an interim term as a member of the Missouri Senate from 1993 to 1994. He ran for the 5th District House of Representatives in 2010, defeating Ken Gillespie and Glen B. Crowther in the August Republican primary. In the November general election he beat out Democrat Judy Wright and Constitution Party candidate Gary Murray to succeed the term limited Jim Guest.

Legislative assignments
Representative Klippenstein serves on the following committees in the 96th General Assembly:
 Utilities
 Agriculture Policy
 Special Standing Committee on Redistricting
 Workforce Development and Workplace Safety

References

Republican Party members of the Missouri House of Representatives
Pennsylvania State University alumni
1937 births
Living people
Republican Party Missouri state senators
People from Maysville, Missouri